The 2015 Sports Authority Mountain West Football Championship Game determined the 2015 football champion of the Mountain West Conference (MW).

History
After the 2013 phase of Mountain West Conference realignment, the league added two new members, San Jose State and Utah State for the 2013 season. By adding two new members for a total of 12 football members (11 all-sports members and football-only Hawaii), the MW was able to split into two divisions, the Mountain and the West, and to organize an annual conference championship game.

Teams

Mountain Division Champions

This is Air Force's first appearance in the Championship

West Division Champions

This is San Diego State's first appearance in the Championship.

Game Summary

Scoring Summary

Statistics

References

Championship Game
Mountain West Conference Football Championship Game
Air Force Falcons football games
San Diego State Aztecs football games
Mountain West Conference Football Championship Game
Mountain West Conference Football Championship Game
2010s in San Diego